Hulf is a surname. Notable people with the surname include:

 Judith Hulf, former president of the Royal College of Anaesthetists
 Isobel Pollock-Hulf (born 1954), professor of engineering

See also
 Huff (surname)